Neiveli Tenpathy is a village in the Orathanadu taluk of Thanjavur district, Tamil Nadu, India.

Demographics 

In 2011, Neiveli Tenpathy had a total population of 3539 with 1814 males and 1725 females. The sex ratio was 951. The literacy rate was 72.92%. The village is administered by Sarpanch.

References 

Villages in Thanjavur district